Peter Waddington (born 13 January 1937) is an Australian rower. He competed in the men's coxed four event at the 1960 Summer Olympics.

References

External links
 

1937 births
Living people
Australian male rowers
Olympic rowers of Australia
Rowers at the 1960 Summer Olympics
Rowers from Sydney
Commonwealth Games medallists in rowing
Commonwealth Games silver medallists for Australia
Commonwealth Games bronze medallists for Australia
Rowers at the 1958 British Empire and Commonwealth Games
20th-century Australian people
21st-century Australian people
Medallists at the 1958 British Empire and Commonwealth Games